"You and Your Heart" is a song by Hawaiian singer-songwriter Jack Johnson and is the lead single from his fifth studio album, To the Sea. The song was released to radio in early April 2010, 
and was released via download on April 6. In Canada, the song premiered on CKOI-FM in Montreal on April 1, 2010.

Background and song meaning
Johnson told MTV News in regards to the inspiration of "You and Your Heart", "[That song] started off with this guitar riff that I had around for a while, actually had it on the last record, and we liked it, but we didn't have any words for it yet, nothing came natural, so I didn't use it. And at some point, some of the books I was reading started leading me in a certain direction, kind of like this broken king character. That area you get in sometimes, where you stop trusting your heart and you start thinking too much about logic and this and that. So it's basically about that separation that can happen between the self and the heart and trying to trust your heart again."

Reception
Sara D. Anderson of AOL called the song "another breezy, rhythm guitar-driven hit" for Johnson, and noted that "the chorus is no different to other Johnson tracks, but the catchy guitar melody—prominent in the track's intro—is slightly more upbeat". 
In April 2010, the single entered the Billboard Rock Songs chart. 
A week later, the song debuted at number 20 on the Billboard Hot 100, his highest-peaking single to date. It has since re-entered at #99 and climb to #65, due to digital increase, after the album release. But like with most of his singles, it reached No. 1 on the Triple A chart. It also reached the top 40 of the Canadian Hot 100, and peaked at number 42 in Japan

The song was used as the theme for the 2010 Little League World Series on ESPN and ABC broadcasts. The music video for the song, available for viewing on YouTube, features Johnson surfing and swimming while singing to the song. This song has been played before takeoff in SunExpress flights in Turkey.

Charts

Weekly charts

Year-end charts

Certifications

References

External links
 "You and Your Heart" at Jack Johnson's official site

2009 songs
2010 singles
Jack Johnson (musician) songs
Songs written by Jack Johnson (musician)
Rock ballads